Ahmad Nadeem Qasmi born Ahmad Shah Awan (20 November 1916 - 10 July 2006) was an Urdu language Pakistani poet, journalist, literary critic, dramatist and short story author. He wrote 50 books on poetry, fiction, criticism, journalism and art. He was a major figure in contemporary Urdu literature. His poetry was distinguished by its humanism, and his Urdu afsana (short story) work is considered by some second only to Munshi Prem Chand in its depiction of rural culture. He was also the editor and publisher of the literary magazine Funoon for almost half a century. He received awards such as the Pride of Performance in 1968 and Sitara-e-Imtiaz in 1980 for his literary work.

Gulzar, one of the most influential writers in modern India, called him his mentor and guru.

Personal life

Background
Qasmi was born on November 20, 1916, in the village of Anga in Khushab District, British India, into an Awan Jatt family. He graduated from a high school in Campbellpur in 1931, (now renamed Attock city in Pakistan), around the time when he wrote his first poem He studied at government college Attock. Later he studied at Sadiq Egerton College in Bahawalpur. He graduated from the University of Punjab, Lahore in 1935. He had a brother, Peerzada Mohammad Bakhsh Qasmi, and a sister. He became an active member of the Progressive Writers Movement as a secretary and was arrested many times during the 1950s and 1970s. He died on 10 July 2006 of complications from asthma at Punjab Institute of Cardiology in Lahore.

Literary career
Qasmi edited several prominent literary journals, including Phool, Tehzeeb-i-Niswaan, Adab-i-Lateef, Savera, Naqoosh, and his own journal, Funoon. He also worked as the editor of the Urdu daily Imroze. Qasimi contributed weekly columns to national newspapers like Rawan Dawan and Daily Jang for several decades. His poetry has included both traditional ghazals and modern nazms. Ahmad Nadeem Qasmi was also committed to mentoring and grooming others.

 
In 1948, he was selected as the secretary-general of the Anjuman-e-Taraqqi Pasand Musannifeen (Progressive Writers Movement) for Punjab. In 1949, he was elected the secretary-general of the organisation for Pakistan. In 1962, Qasmi published his own literary magazine Fanoon, with the support of writers and poets including Khadija Mastoor, Hajra Masroor, Ahmed Faraz, Amjad Islam Amjad, Ata ul Haq Qasmi, and Munnu Bhai . Qasmi was the mentor of the poet Parveen Shakir. In 1974, he was appointed secretary-general of Majlis-Taraqee-Adab, a literary body established by the government of West Pakistan in 1958.

In December 2011, Professor Fateh Muhammad Malik and noted columnist Ata ul Haq Qasmi arranged a seminar on the life and achievements of Ahmad Nadeem Qasmi at the International Islamic University, Islamabad.
Urdu writers, poets, and critics have appreciated and admired his literary work, although there is also criticism of his literary work and his personality. Fateh Muhammad Malik is a long-time friend of Ahmed Nadeem Qasmi. In his book about the life and personality of Ahmed Nadeem Qasmi called 'Nadeem Shanasi', he gives the impression that it is evident from Qasmi's letters to him that Qasmi had a buried dislike for Faiz Ahmed Faiz and perhaps considered himself a poet greater than Faiz. "The letters also reveal that Qasmi had a narcissistic personality and an inflated ego when it came to his contemporaries. He consciously or unconsciously tried to belittle Faiz, though without much effect."

Some people in literary circles of Pakistan also think that there were some envy and rivalry among Ahmad Nadeem Qasmi, Wazir Agha and Munir Niazi.

An example of his poetry, with translation

Bibliography

Poetry

 Jalal-o-Jamal
 Shola-i-Gul
 Kisht-i-Wafa
 Dasht-e-wafa 
 Dawam 
 Muheet 
 Loh-e-khaak 
 Baseet 
 Jamal 
 Arz-o-sama

Short stories
 Afsaanay (40 best short stories selected by Ahmad Nadeem Qasmi himself)
 Chopaal (1939)
 Gandasa was also a source of inspiration for the legendary character Maula Jatt
 Sannata
 Kapaas ka Phool
 Aabley
 Tuloo-O-Gharoob
 Sailab-o-Gardab
 Anchal
 ghar se ghar tak
 Nila-pathar
 Dawam-dar-o-deewar
 Bazar-e-hayat
 Aas-paas
 Jhoota
 Bhoot
 Jalebis

Awards and recognition
 Pride of Performance Award by the President of Pakistan in 1968
 Sitara-i-Imtiaz (Star of Excellence) Award by the President of Pakistan in 1980
 Lifetime Achievement Award by the Pakistan Academy of Letters
 Islamabad 7th Avenue named after Ahmed Nadeem Qasmi.

See also

List of Pakistani journalists
List of Pakistani poets
List of Pakistani writers

References

External links 
 

1916 births
2006 deaths
Respiratory disease deaths in Pakistan
Deaths from asthma
People from Khushab District
Poets from Lahore
Urdu-language poets from Pakistan
Linguists from Pakistan
Urdu-language non-fiction writers
Linguists of Urdu
Urdu critics
Pakistani television writers
Pakistani male journalists
Pakistani novelists
Pakistani dramatists and playwrights
Pakistani male short story writers
Pakistani literary critics
Recipients of the Pride of Performance
Recipients of Sitara-i-Imtiaz
Punjabi people
People from British India
Urdu-language writers from British India
21st-century Urdu-language writers
20th-century Urdu-language writers
20th-century Pakistani poets
21st-century Pakistani novelists
20th-century Pakistani novelists
20th-century Pakistani short story writers
20th-century Pakistani male writers
Male television writers
20th-century linguists
20th-century Pakistani philosophers
20th-century screenwriters
Hashemite people
Alids
Awan
Alvis